The Sisu-class motor torpedo boats was a series of two Italian MAS type motor torpedo boats of the Finnish Navy. The vessels were constructed in 1916 by the Orlando shipyard in Livorno, Italy. Sisu and Hurja were purchased by the Finns in 1920, and saw service in World War II. When dashing forward at full speed, the vessels sprayed water high in the air, earning the nickname "the fountains" from Finnish sailors.

Sisu missed with her first torpedo, having mistaken the foam painted on the minesweeper's bow for an indication that it was actually moving. A second torpedo hit the minesweeper amidship and sank her.

Vessels of the class
Sisu Ex-MTV 1 in Finnish service, and ex-MAS 220 in Italian service. She was used as a torpedo boat until 1942, and then transferred to Lake Ladoga, where she served as a patrol vessel. Sisu was broken up after the war.
Hurja Ex-MTV 2 in Finnish service, and ex-MAS 221 in Italian service. She was used as a torpedo boat until 1941. Hurja was broken up after the war.

References

Torpedo boats of the Finnish Navy
Ships built in Italy
Torpedo boat classes